The Maluku Sovereignty Front (FKM) is a secessionist movement on Ambon Island, aiming to restore the Republic of the South Moluccas (RMS). It was established on June 15, 2000 at Ambon.

They have been monitored by the Indonesian military for stockpiling weapons and other activities. Indonesian sources claim that the group first emerged in January 1999.

One of their activities has been to fly the banned flag of the Republic of South Maluku in public places to commemorate an unsuccessful secession attempt in 1950. 

The leader of the FKM organisation Alex Manuputty has fled to the United States, but continues to support independence.

References

Further reading

Rebel groups in Indonesia
Post-Suharto era
Separatism in Indonesia
Secessionist organizations in Asia
Republic of South Maluku
2000 establishments in Indonesia